The four-eyed fishes are a genus, Anableps, of fishes in the family Anablepidae. They have eyes raised above the top of the head and divided in two different parts, so that they can see below and above the water surface at the same time.

The optomotor response or OMR has been used as a test to investigate potential differential visual processing in Anableps on normal versus ‘blinded’ fish (the eyes are actually covered—not physically blinded). It was found  that the OMR does exist in Anableps and that the strength of this response is dependent on the visual field being tested—a stronger OMR was seen as a result of visual stimulation from the aerial environment.

Like their relatives, the onesided livebearers, four-eyed fishes mate only on one side, right-"handed" males with left-"handed" females and vice versa.

These fish inhabit fresh and brackish water and are only rarely coastal marine. They originate in lowlands in southern Mexico to Honduras and northern South America.

Species
There are currently three recognized species in this genus:
Anableps anableps (Linnaeus, 1758) (Largescale foureyes)
Anableps dowei T. N. Gill, 1861 (Pacific foureyed fish)
Anableps microlepis J. P. Müller & Troschel, 1844 (Foureyes)

Physical characteristics 

The maximum length of four-eyed fishes is up to 32 cm TL in A. microlepis, making this species the largest in the order Cyprinodontiformes.

Four-eyed fish have only two eyes, but the eyes are specially adapted for their surface-dwelling lifestyle. In early development, the four-eyed fish’s frontal bone expands dorsally allowing the eyes to be positioned on top of their head and appear bulging.  This allows the fish to simultaneously see above and below the water as it floats at the surface. The eyes are divided into dorsal and ventral halves, separated by a pigmented strip of tissue. Each eye has two  pupils and two corneas filtering light onto one lens, refracting onto separate hemiretinas and processed through one optic disc. The upper (dorsal) half of the eye is adapted for vision in air, the lower (ventral) half for vision in water. The lens of the eye also changes in thickness top to bottom to compensate for the difference in the refractive indices of air versus water. The ventral hemiretina is characterized by thicker cell layers containing more sensory neurons and an increased visual acuity compared to the dorsal hemiretina.

Four-eyed fish are livebearers. Along with their sister genus Jenynsia they mate on one side only, right-"handed" males with left-"handed" females and vice versa. The male has specialized anal rays which are greatly elongated and fused into a tube called a gonopodium associated with the sperm duct which he uses as an intromittent organ to deliver sperm to the female.

Behavior

Four-eyed fish spend most of their time at the surface of the water. Their diet mostly consists of terrestrial insects which are readily available at the surface, however they may consume other foods such as other invertebrates, diatoms, and small fishes.

The fish will group differently depending on the species. A. anableps commonly congregates in schools. A. microlepis also is gregarious, but restricts its schools to about a dozen individuals; it is also recorded to be found alone or as couples.

A. anableps is also known for the ability to survive out of water when exposed to air, especially during low tide.

See also
 Rhinomugil, a genus of Asian and Australian mullets popularly known as false four-eyed fish
 Brownsnout spookfish, a fish with each eye divided into a part that works refractor and a part that works reflector

References

External links 

 

Anablepidae
Viviparous fish
Fish of Central America
Fish of South America
Freshwater fish of Central America
Freshwater fish of South America
Marine fauna of South America